"So in to You" is a 1977 hit single by the Atlanta Rhythm Section. It was the first release from their sixth studio LP, A Rock and Roll Alternative.

Background
In "So in to You", the singer admits an instant and mysteriously compelling attraction to a stranger entering the room, and is unable to focus on anything else.  He attempts to gain the stranger's attention, hoping that she will be able to make a personal connection and that the "vibe" he feels will be mutual.

Chart history
The song became their greatest hit, spending three weeks at number seven on the U.S. Billboard Hot 100 and two weeks at number five on Cash Box.  It did best in Canada, where it reached number two, blocked from the top only by the Eagles' "Hotel California". "So in to You" was also an Adult Contemporary hit: it reached number 11 in the U.S. and number 12 in Canada.

Weekly charts

Year-end charts

Cover versions
1994: Shudder to Think included a cover of the song on the album Pony Express Record

References

External links
 

1976 songs
1977 singles
Atlanta Rhythm Section songs
Polydor Records singles
Songs written by Buddy Buie